Mons Olai Haukeland (29 February 1892 – 26 July 1983) was a Norwegian gymnastics teacher and military officer, and district leader of Milorg during World War II until his arrest in 1943. He was imprisoned at Grini concentration camp from 8 to 9 December 1943, then at Sachsenhausen until the camp was liberated. He has been called father of the Norwegian Home Guard, being its general inspector from its formation in 1946 to 1958. He was promoted to the rank of major general in 1954.

Haukeland was appointed a Commander of the Royal Norwegian Order of St. Olav in 1959, Commander of the Danish Order of the Dannebrog and of the Swedish Order of the Sword. He was also awarded the Defence Medal 1940–1945 with Rosette, and the Home Guard Medal of Merit.

Haukeland was born in Os, and was educated as military officer and gymnastics teacher. He worked as a gymnastics teacher in Bergen from 1923 to 1943.

References

1892 births
People from Os, Hordaland
1983 deaths
Norwegian schoolteachers
Norwegian Army personnel of World War II
Norwegian Army generals
Norwegian prisoners of war in World War II
World War II prisoners of war held by Germany
Grini concentration camp survivors
Sachsenhausen concentration camp survivors
Norwegian resistance members
Commanders of the Order of the Dannebrog
Commanders of the Order of the Sword